Walter Edward "Turk" Broda (May 15, 1914 — October 17, 1972) was a Canadian professional ice hockey player and coach. A goaltender, Broda played his entire career for the Toronto Maple Leafs of the National Hockey League (NHL) between 1935 and 1951, taking a brief hiatus from 1943 to 1946 to fight in the Second World War.  He was the first goaltender to reach 300 wins. After retiring from active play, Broda coached minor league and junior ice hockey teams. In 2017 Broda was named one of the '100 Greatest NHL Players' in history.

Personal life
Broda was born in Brandon, Manitoba to a Ukrainian family. Although he is commonly referred to as Polish by mistake (to the extent of him being inducted in the National Polish American Sports Hall of Fame in 2005), Publicity Director Stan Obodiac of the Maple Leafs, who knew Broda, dispelled this and confirmed Broda's Ukrainian origin.

Broda acquired the nickname of "Turkey Egg" during his school days in Brandon because of his many freckles. "Turkey Egg" soon became "Turk", and the name followed him.

Playing career

Early career
Broda started his playing career with the Brandon Athletics and the Brandon Native Sons. After playing a few years with them he played for the Winnipeg Monarchs, Detroit Farm Crest and the Toronto St. Michael's Majors. In 1932–33, he won the Memorial Cup. In 1933–34, the Detroit Red Wings invited Turk Broda to their training camp. But with Normie Smith and John Ross Roach already in Detroit, there was no way Broda could start in the NHL. Instead, he started his professional career with the Detroit Olympics.

NHL career
In 1935–36, he was acquired by the Toronto Maple Leafs for $7500. Broda emerged as one of the league's top goaltenders in the 1940–41 season, as he led the league in wins with 28 in 48 games. In 1941–42, he won his first Stanley Cup with the Leafs, who came back from being down three games to none against the Detroit Red Wings in one of the greatest comebacks in NHL history.

In 1942–43, Broda joined the army for two and a half years during World War II. In 1945–46, Turk Broda returned to the Maple Leafs roster and was instrumental in the team's Stanley Cup victories in 1946–47, 1947–48, 1948–49 and in 1950–51. Turk Broda retired in 1951–52, at 38 years of age.

"Battle of the Bulge"
The "Battle of the Bulge" was a battle between him and the owner of the Toronto Maple Leafs Conn Smythe about Broda losing weight. This argument brought a lot of attention from the media in Toronto, Ontario. Smythe ordered Broda to lose  in a week and brought Al Rollins and Gilles Mayer from the minor leagues just to pressure Broda into losing weight. If Broda could not lose weight, then he would be removed from his goalkeeping duties. In the end, Broda lost enough weight to keep his job, though Broda admitted years later that the scales were rigged in his favour.

Legacy
After retiring, Broda became a coach. He coached the Ottawa Senators in the Quebec Hockey League. He later became the head coach of the Toronto Marlboros. He led the Marlboros to back to back Memorial Cup championships in 1955, and in 1956.

Broda was inducted into the Hockey Hall of Fame in 1967 and was inducted into the Manitoba Sports Hall of Fame and Museum in 1983 as an "Honoured" member. In 1998, he was ranked number 60 on The Hockey News''' list of the 100 Greatest Hockey Players. With 13 shutouts and a GAA of 1.98 in the playoffs, he helped the Leafs win 5 Stanley Cups and establish a dynasty. In 2005, Broda was inducted into the National Polish American Sports Hall of Fame.  He died in 1972 at the age of 58 from a heart attack.

Awards and achievements
 Turnbull Cup MJHL Championship (1933)
 Memorial Cup Championship (1933)
 Calder Cup Championship (1936)
 Vezina Trophy (1941 and 1948)
 NHL First All-Star Team Goalie (1941 and 1948)
 Stanley Cup Championship (1942, 1947, 1948, 1949, and 1951)
 NHL Second All-Star Team Goalie (1942)
 In 1998, he was ranked number 60 on The Hockey News''' list of the 100 Greatest Hockey Players
 Inducted into the Hockey Hall of Fame in 1967.
 Honoured Member of the Manitoba Hockey Hall of Fame
 Inducted into the Manitoba Sports Hall of Fame and Museum in 1983
 #1 jersey retired by the Toronto Maple Leafs
 In January, 2017, Broda was part of the first group of players to be named one of the '100 Greatest NHL Players' in history.

Career statistics

Regular season and playoffs

See also
List of NHL goaltenders with 300 wins
List of NHL players who spent their entire career with one franchise

References

External links

Turk Broda 's  biography at Manitoba Hockey Hall of Fame
Turk Broda’s biography at Manitoba Sports Hall of Fame and Museum

1914 births
1972 deaths
Brandon Native Sons players
Canadian expatriate ice hockey players in the United States
Canadian ice hockey coaches
Canadian ice hockey goaltenders
Canadian military personnel of World War II
Canadian people of Ukrainian descent
Eastern Hockey League coaches
Detroit Olympics (IHL) players
Hockey Hall of Fame inductees
Ice hockey people from Manitoba
London Knights coaches
Quebec Aces coaches
Sportspeople from Brandon, Manitoba
Stanley Cup champions
Toronto Maple Leafs players
Toronto Marlboros coaches
Toronto St. Michael's Majors players
Vezina Trophy winners
Winnipeg Monarchs players